Gérald Godin (November 13, 1938 – October 12, 1994) was a Quebec poet and politician.

Born in Trois-Rivières, Quebec, he worked as a journalist at La Presse and other newspapers and magazines. His most important poetry collection, Les cantouques: poèmes en langue verte, populaire et quelquefois française, was published in 1967. He was among those arrested under the War Measures Act during the October Crisis in 1970.

In the 1976 Quebec provincial election, he won a seat as a candidate for the Parti Québécois, heavily defeating incumbent Premier Robert Bourassa in his own riding of Mercier. He served in various cabinet posts in the governments of René Lévesque and Pierre-Marc Johnson. His life companion was the Québécois singer Pauline Julien.

As a poet, he won the Prix Québec-Paris for his 1987 work Ils ne demandaient qu'à brûler.

Godin died from brain cancer in October 1994.

The area surrounding the Mont-Royal metro station has been named Place Gérald-Godin in his honour. One of his poems, Tango de Montréal, is displayed as a mural overlooking the square.

Cégep Gérald-Godin (college), in Sainte-Geneviève, Montreal, is named after him.

See also

List of Mauriciens
Politics of Quebec
Quebec general elections
History of Quebec
Quebec sovereigntism

Electoral record

References

External links
Gérald Godin's entry in The Canadian Encyclopedia

1938 births
1994 deaths
French Quebecers
Parti Québécois MNAs
Journalists from Quebec
Writers from Quebec
20th-century Canadian poets
20th-century Canadian male writers
Canadian male poets
People from Trois-Rivières
Canadian poets in French
October Crisis
Canadian male non-fiction writers
Deaths from cancer in Quebec
Neurological disease deaths in Quebec
Deaths from brain tumor